The Great Oromo Expansions, also known as the Oromo migrations, were a series of expansions in the 16th and 17th centuries by the Boorana starting from 48-64 kilometers east of Lake Abaya and around the Bale Mountains. Over the centuries due to many factors, mostly the wars against foreign forces and internal conflicts  which preoccupied Ethiopia, would further encourage the numerous Oromo tribes to expand towards central Ethiopia.

Historiography

Because the Oromo did not keep a written record of the expansion, this article must refer to Ethiopian, Portuguese and Arabic sources for the reasons behind the expansion. In particular, a 16th-century Ethiopian monk, named Bahrey, is the foremost source on the expansion. Written in Ge'ez, his book was called the History of the Galla  (Ge'ez: ዜናሁ ፡ ለጋላ zēnahu legalla), "Galla" being an older name by which the Abyssinians and Portuguese and Italians referred to Oromos, but it is now considered as pejorative. The book was written in 1593 and detailed the expansions from 1522 to his age. 

Further information can be gleaned from other contemporaries such as the Ethiopian monk Abba Paulos, Shihab ed-Din's Futuh al-Habasha "Conquest of Abyssinia", João Bermudes, Francisco de Almeida, Jerónimo Lobo,l and various Abyssinian royal chronicles (e.g. those of Gelawdewos, Sarsa Dengel and Susenyos I though that of Sarsa Dengel may have been written by Bahrey).

History
Gudifecha adoption tradition also lead to massive diversification within Oromo populations as they expanded during the 16th century.

Legend of Liqimssa 
The legend of Liqimssa is an ancient legend stemming from the Borana sect of the Oromo peoples that is credited as having been one of the main motivations for the beginning of the Oromo expansions. The Liqimssa roughly translates to "The Swallower" and was told to be a beast that consumed people one by one until there was nobody left to fight against it. It is meant to embody "hunger", and the story represents how a powerful entity will consume all there is around it until the "land of plenty" (in reference to the Borana homeland) is left barren and empty. The legend is interpreted by Mohammed Hassen to be the embodiment of the Christian kingdom's growing power and influence in the regions directly south of the Oromo homelands. As Christians military colonists continued to bump up against the Oromo from the south, Oromo pastoralists responded by beginning their expansions northward.

Early expansions
The early expansions were characterized by sporadic raids by the Oromo on the frontiers of the Ethiopian kingdom. After capturing cattle and other booty, the raiding parties would quickly return to their homelands. Actual settlement of new territories would not begin until the gada of Meslé.

Mélbah (1522–1530) and Mudena (1530–1538)
According to Bahrey, the earliest Oromo expansion occurred under the Oromo luba Melbah, during the time of Emperor Lebna Dengel. He states that they invaded the neighbouring Bale, in the southeast, just before the invasions of Ahmad ibn Ibrahim al-Ghazi of Adal  in the north. These early incursions (Oromo: razzia) were limited, however, as the encroaching groups returned to their homeland near the Shebelle River after each raid. Raids continued under Mudena past the Wabi Shebelle, but these groups also returned home shortly. The reason for the Oromo's returning after their short conquests is that the Christian and Muslim kingdoms that surrounded Oromo pastoralists were deeply embroiled in wars. Instead of engaging with either kingdom directly, they targeted isolated communities that would go unnoticed and allowed their enemies to destroy each other without Oromo intervention.

Three Stages of Oromo Movements 
By the 1530s, the Oromo pastoralists had developed a three-staged method for territorial expansion; "scouting, night time surprise attack and settlement" (159). The introduction of scouting teams shows that the Oromo pastoralists had quickly become accustomed to border warfare. The night time attacks that would come to follow were unceasing and relentless, stripping the community of their "booty" and killing a large amount of the warrior class, then escaping before dawn as to avoid being followed back to their basecamps. Once the community under siege was broken down enough to be settled without resistance, the remaining peoples would quickly be integrated through Moggaasaa, having their status', material goods and general livelihoods returned to them. The remaining warriors would join the Oromo gada's troops. With each period of adoption into the fighting class, the Oromo's knowledge of the local terrain would increase drastically.

Kilolé (1538–1546)
After the death of Ahmed Gragn, Kilolé resumed his predecessor's raids and pierced further into Ethiopian territory. Aided by the weakening of both the Ethiopian Empire and Adal, he raided as far as the province of Dewaro, north of Bali. Again, however, after each raid, the parties returned to their villages. Bahrey's dating might, however, be off, as Shihab ad-din, who had written a decade before Ahmed Gragn's death, noted a locality named Werre Qallu, an Oromo name, in the province of Dawaro. Francisco de Almeida, however, agreed with Bahrey's dating, by affirming that the Oromo first began migrating around the time of Ahmed Gragn's invasion (1527).

Bifolé (1546–1554)
During the time of luba Bifolé, the Oromo migration achieved its first major success. All previous movements had been minor raids on neighbouring provinces, but under Bifolé, new raids were undertaken that began to weaken Ethiopian control. All of Dewaro was pillaged, and Fatagar to its north was attacked for the first time.
Furthermore, according to Bahrey, the inhabitants of the pillaged areas were enslaved to become gebrs (Ge'ez: ገብር gabr; Amh. ግብር gebr, Tgn. ግብሪ gebri), a term referring more precisely to "tax-paying serfs", similar to the serfs in Ethiopia during feudal times. Emperor Gelawdewos, however, campaigned in the south as a result of those attacks. According to his chronicle, the Emperor defeated the Oromo incursions and made subject to his rule those he captured, which prevented further attacks for some time, with further incursions reduced to skirmishes. The initial attacks were significant, however, on a much larger and more devastating scale to the Ethiopian dynasty. Despite his reprisals, Gelawdewos was troubled and was forced to settle refugees in a town of Wej, north of Lake Zway, around 1550-1.

Settlement

Meslé (1554–1562)
Meslé's time represent a fundamental change in the expansion of the Oromo. Newly-taken territories were permanently settled by Oromo for the first time, and mules and horses began to be ridden by the first time. The adoption of horseback riding from the north greatly increased the Oromo fighting power and put them on par with Ethiopian troops, who were largely equipped with firearms.
In the new phase of migration adopted under Meslé, the Oromo defeated Emperor Gelawdewos's Jan Amora corps, allowing them to pillage a number of towns. Instead of returning to their homelands, however, they stayed in the new territories. Gelawdewos campaigned against the Oromo as a result, defeating them at 'Asa Zeneb (yet unidentified), but he was nevertheless unable to drive them from the frontier provinces and continued to build the new town in Wej for new refugees.

Oromo expansions were not restricted to Ethiopian territories either, as activities against Adal were also pursued. The forces of Nur ibn Mujahid (r. 1551/2–1567/8), the Amir of Harar, for instance, were soundly defeated by the Oromo. According to Bahrey, there had been "no such slaughter since the Oromo first invaded".

Harmufa (1562–1570) and Robalé (1570–1578)
During the luba of Harmufa rule, the Oromo advanced even deeper into Ethiopian territory. With the use of horses, they were able to attack the province Amhara, and  Angot. Further advances were made under Robalé during whose time Shewa was pillaged and Gojjam attacked. For the first time, Oromo advances were devastating core Ethiopian provinces, but their earlier incursions had been simply against frontier provinces. Despite the deeper attacks, the core provinces remained under Ethiopian control, and Emperor Sarsa Dengel carried out punitive expeditions in return. One such reprisal in 1573 involved the engagement of the Oromo near Lake Zway in a frontier province. He defeated them, took their cattle and distributed the herd among his subjects, who were described in his chronicle as "becoming rich" as a result.

Adal period (1562–1579)
At the same time, Barentu Oromo groups attacked Adal Sultanate, which was greatly weakened by its wars with the Christian Ethiopians leading to no potential resistance. Only a few small groups of Muslims were able to flee to Harar and survive within the fortified city. The greater part of the Ethiopian Muslim population was assimilated by the Oromos.

The city Dire Dawa was part of Adal during the medieval times. After the weakening of Adal, it was exclusively settled by Dir, which is a major Somali clan. The Oromos were able to penetrate through the city and settle into those areas and to assimilate some of the local Gurgura clan.

The Hawiye and the Dir clans were the predominant inhabitants of Hararghe Highlands (land of the Hararis) in the 16th century after the weakening of Adal. The Oromos took advantage of the crippling state and decided to also invade and to occupy the Hararghe Highlands and assimilate with Somali clan population of Jarso, Akisho, Gurgura, Nole, Metta, Oborra and Bursuk. All were sub-clans of Dir, a major Somali clan, and were later confederated into Oromo tribe, the Afran Qallo clan.

Reprisals under Sarsa Dengel
Forced to fight the Ottomans in the north of his Empire, Sarsa Dengel turned to curb the spread of the Oromo in the south in the 1570s. The first mention of his actions is in his short Royal Chronicle, which states that he fought a force of Borana Oromo at Lake Zway under a luba named Ambissa. After the 1572 rains, the Oromo had taken Wej, and the Emperor gathered his forces from throughout Ethiopia to form an army at Gind Beret. From there, Sarsa Dengel headed south, where he found that the Oromo had also taken Maya. Despite the small size of his army, he was able to defeat the Oromo in the area, push them back to Fatagar, and capture a large number of cattle. Sarsa Dengel again learned in 1574 of Oromo incursions in Shewa and of the pillaging of cattle in lowland Zéma. The Emperor sent Azzaj Halibo with only 50 cavalry to the area, who forced the Oromo to flee and sent the heads of 80 Gallas to the Emperor as trophies. Sarsa Dengel was again forced to head north with his army to crush the Ottoman-backed Bahr Negus Yeshaq, but later returned to Wej in 1577-8 to fend off Oromo advances in the area. As a result of the battle in the Mojjo Valley (just east of modern Addis Ababa) against the Borana Oromo, corpses were strewn all over the surrounding countryside. The Emperor then fended off an attack in Dembiya by the Abati Oromo at a place called Weyne Deg'a. As a result of the battle, according to Bahrey, less than ten Oromo survived.

Birmajé (1578–1586)
Despite Sarsa Dengel's military campaigns, the Oromo expansion continued to spread northward during this time. It was under luba Birmajé that the Oromo first began to use body-length ox-hide shields. The shields allowed the Oromo to resist arrows and therefore to defeat the Mayas. The Oromo often came into conflict with Daharagot, one of Sarsa Dengel's commanders, who was often successful. Nevertheless, during this time, the Oromo pillaged Ar'ine in Wej, killing Ethiopian couriers in the process. Further advances were made around Lake Tana, Dembiya, and (old) Damot, which was surrounded, and some of its inhabitants were enslaved.

Mul'eta (1586–1594)
Under luba Mul'eta a large raid (Oromo: dulaguto) was made on Gojjam south of Lake Tana. With the Ottoman situation in the north largely under control, Sarsa Dengel again took the initiative against the Oromo in the south, where he forced the Dawé (or Jawé) Oromo in Wej to flight. Bahrey praised Sarsa Dengel's campaign by stating that he "did not act according to the custom of the kings his ancestors, who, when making war were in the habit of sending their troops ahead, remaining themselves in the rear with the pick of their cavalry and infantry, praising those who went forward bravely and punishing those who lagged behind.l". Despite Bahrey's praise, Sarsa Dengel was forced to use coercion to draw troops, and decreed that anyone who failed to heed his call to arms would have his house pillaged and property confiscated.

17th century

Ethiopian Empire
During the first half of the 17th century, invasions by different Oromo groups were a permanent menace to the Ethiopian Empire. About 1617, the Oromos attacked Begemder and Gojjam, which were central regions of the empire. Between 1620 and 1660, the Ethiopian emperors had to defend different parts of their territory but could not stop to the waves of advancing Oromo groups. The Tulama expanded from Shoa into Amhara and the Wallo and Azebo overran Angot, parts of Amhara and Waj, Begemder, and Tigre. In 1642 the eastern Oromo nearly annihilated the Ethiopian army from Tigray. Under the reign of emperors Fasiladas and Yohannes II, the Oromo seem to have been virtually unrestrained in their expansion. Iyasu I the Great (1682-1706) resumed the offensive against the Oromo and recruited battalions of Oromo which pledged their allegiance, whom he settled in conquered areas. Tulama and Liban Oromo were settled in northern Gojjam and Begemder and were encouraged to convert to Christianity. Some of their authorities were appointed to high offices in the army and in the administration of the provinces. In 1684-1685, Oromo groups fought against Emperor Iyasu I in Wollo and Gojjam. In 1694, the Gugru-Oromo attacked Gojjam and Begemder.

Although the military expansion of the Oromo continued, many Oromo groups started to settle in Ethiopian territory and developed into a political power, which was used by the different secular and ecclesiastical groupings. By the late 18th century, they were taking an active part in the political formation of the Ethiopian state. The process of mutual assimilation between the Oromo newcomers and other inhabitants of the empire was well under way.

Ajuran Empire
In the mid-17th century, the Oromos began expanding from their homeland around Lake Abaya in southern Ethiopia towards the southern Somali coast while the Ajuran Empire was at the height of its power. The Garen rulers conducted several military expeditions, known as the Gaal Madow wars, against the Oromo warriors, who converted those that were captured to Islam. The Ajuran with their guns forced the Oromo conquerors to reverse their migrations towards the war-ravaged Muslim Adalites.

18th century
Around 1710, the Macha Oromo reached to the Gonga kingdom of Ennarea in the Gibe region  that had a king by name of Shisafotchi. He tried to come to terms with the situation by absorbing into his administration the energy of ambitious Macha individuals. That proved to be the cause of his destruction. By favouring the Oromo at his courts, Shisafotchi alienated his own people. The ambitious Oromo individuals at his court harnessed the popular fury to their own advantage by overthrowing the king and taking over the kingdom. 

Also around the 18th century, the Macha Oromo crossed the Gojeb river and led an invasion of the Kingdom of Kaffa. They found formidable natural barriers, which opposed their advance towards Kaffa. The mountainous jungle terrain made rapid cavalry attack and retreat virtually impossible, and their advance was halted by the Kafficho. They, however, conquered all territories north of the Gojeb, including the city of Jimma

See also
History of Ethiopia
Oromo people
Human migration
List of Oromo subgroups and clans

Citations

References

Further reading
 Mohammed Hassan, The Oromo of Ethiopia: A History 1570–1860

 G. W. B. Huntingford, "The Galla of Ethiopia; The Kingdoms of Kafa and Janjero North Eastern Africa Part II"

 

History of Ethiopia
Internal migrations in Africa
Historical migrations
Society of Ethiopia